Actinopus taragui is a species of mygalomorph spiders in the family Actinopodidae. It is found in Argentina.

References

taragui
Spiders described in 2018